The Yuehu Mosque is a mosque in Haishu District, Ningbo City, Zhejiang Province, China.

History
The mosque was constructed in 1699 during the reign of Kangxi Emperor of Qing Dynasty. In July 2011, the mosque was listed as a historical monument of Zhejiang Province.

Transportation
The mosque is accessible within walking distance south of Ximenkou Station of Ningbo Rail Transit.

See also
 Islam in China
 List of mosques in China

References

1699 establishments in China
Buildings and structures in Zhejiang
Mosques in China
Religious buildings and structures completed in 1699